Adalbert Agh (born 3 December 1945) is a Romanian rower. He competed in the men's coxless four event at the 1972 Summer Olympics.

References

External links
 
 
 

1945 births
Living people
Romanian male rowers
Olympic rowers of Romania
Rowers at the 1972 Summer Olympics
Sportspeople from Oradea